Uhtju Nature Reserve is a nature reserve which is located in Lääne-Viru County, Estonia.

The area of the nature reserve is 2956 ha.

The protected area was founded in 1938 to protect Lõuna-Uhtju Islet. In 1958 the Põhja-Uhtju Islet (or Uhtju Islet) was taken under protection. In 2001 the protected areas was designated to the nature reserve.

References

Nature reserves in Estonia
Geography of Lääne-Viru County